Mohammad Ismail Abu Shanab (Arabic: 
محمد اسماعيل ابو شنب; born 25 August 1998), is a Qatari professional footballer who plays as a forward for Qatar Stars League side Al-Gharafa.

Career statistics

Club

Notes

References

External links

1998 births
Living people
Qatari footballers
Association football forwards
Al-Gharafa SC players
Qatar Stars League players
Qatar youth international footballers